Students for Cooperation (SFC) is a co-operative federation of student co-operatives across the UK, which exists to "develop and support the growing student co-operative movement". As a secondary co-op, the organization is owned and controlled by its constituent member co-operatives.

The membership includes 24 food co-ops, four housing co-ops, one bike co-op , and one swap/re-use co-op.

Conferences  
Students for Cooperation hosts between 2-3 conferences a year. These conferences move between different locations - generally in different university cities in which student cooperatives are based. These conferences feature forums for debate and discussion about the direction of Students for Cooperation, workshops to train individuals in member cooperatives, and sessions provided by guest speakers from the wider Co-operative Movement.

The conferences also facilitate General Meetings in which policy proposals can be submitted by member cooperatives for Students for Cooperation to adopt.

The founding conference was held at the University of Birmingham and featured a guest speaker from North American Students of Cooperation.

National Body of Student Housing Cooperatives (NBSHC) 
Students for Cooperation through funding obtained from the East of England Co-operative Society contracted Acorn Co-operative Support  to undertake a primary report  into the establishment of a National Body of Student Housing Cooperatives to address issues holding back the growth of existing student housing cooperatives and establishment of new ones across the UK. The report in part was inspired by the successes seen in the US and Canada by the work of North American Students of Cooperation.

See also 
 Birmingham Student Housing Co-operative
 Edinburgh Student Housing Co-operative
 Sheffield Student Housing Co-operative

References

External links
 students. coop – The Students for Cooperation 

Cooperative federations
Co-operatives in the United Kingdom
Student organizations established in 2013